Continental Championship Wrestling was a professional wrestling promotion based in Knoxville, Tennessee, and Dothan, Alabama from 1985 until 1989, owned by Ron Fuller. The promotion evolved out of the NWA-affiliated Southeastern Championship Wrestling and Gulf Coast Championship Wrestling territories owned by Fuller, who purchased the Knoxville territory from John Cazana in 1974 and the Alabama/Florida territory in 1977. When Fuller sold the promotion to David Woods in 1988, the name was changed to Continental Wrestling Federation.

History

The Gulf Coast years (1954–1974)
Nashville promoter Roy Welch had purchased the Mobile-Pensacola end of Leroy McGuirk's Tri-State Wrestling. Unlike McGuirk, who only promoted in the Mobile-Pensacola area on special occasions called spot shows, Welch decided to make promoting in Mobile-Pensacola a frequent attraction in the summer. However, due to his obligations in Nashville, his son Buddy Fuller (Edward Welch) was made booker for Mobile-Pensacola, and Fuller eventually expanded the territory into Mississippi-Louisiana as well.

At this point, the territory didn't even have a name, its own belts, or even its own wrestlers (aside from members of The Welch Family of course). They often relied on wrestlers and champions from Buddy's and their Uncle Lester Welch's territory. He ran in places like Tampa, Florida, and Atlanta, Georgia (which would eventually become Championship Wrestling from Florida and Georgia Championship Wrestling), as well getting help from his father in Nashville, Tennessee, and some occasional help from his Uncles Herb and Jack. These early attempts would start to unravel when Buddy Fuller failed to make payments to the territory from his father Roy Welch. Buddy's cousin Lee Fields (Albert Lee Hatfield) would save the territory and gave it the name "Gulf Coast Championship Wrestling".

Lee Fields would eventually buy the territory from Roy Welch and Buddy Fuller, and run shows in the area for almost two decades with Rocky McGuire booking Dothan-Panama City and Bob Kelly booking Mobile-Pensacola and Mississippi after a falling out with promoters in Louisiana with Mobile-Pensacola only running in the summer months. Kelly turned the promotion around from holding monthly and seasonal shows in a few towns which only drew a few hundred people to holding weekly shows in a different town night after night with local television exposure in each market, which led to each arena drawing thousands. Bob Kelly left the wrestling business in 1976 to enter real estate and spend more time with family, and Lee Fields found it more difficult to operate both his wrestling promotion and Mobile International Speedway at the same time.. So he sold it to his cousin Ron Fuller around 1977-1978.

The Southeastern years (1974–1985)
In 1974, Ron Fuller purchased Southeastern Championship Wrestling based in Knoxville, Tennessee from John Cazana, where he focused mainly on the east Tennessee area.  In 1977, Ron Fuller took over the territory his grandfather and father had founded when GCCW folded and Fuller expanded the SECW to run in the Southern Alabama, Northern Florida area in addition the Eastern Tennessee territory he already established. This was initially labelled ”the Southern Division” of the SECW treating them as two separate entities despite the original plan to run a talent exchange between the two involving talent spending sixteen months in one end of the territory and then spend eight months in another to regain momentum after losing steam in the previous one.

In June 1979, several members of the talent roster and behind the scenes personnel left SECW out frustration involving backstage politics with Ron's brother Robert Fuller who was considered lazy in terms of booking the territory, and spent many nights partying and felt his spot in Southeastern was owed to him since he was a member of The Welch/Fuller family. Led by Bob Roop, Ronnie Garvin, Bob Orton Jr. and Boris Malenko, All-Star Championship Wrestling fought a six-month promotional war over the Knoxville territory. Many of these defectors later joined the Kentucky based outlaw promotion International Championship Wrestling owned and operated by Angelo Poffo.

After this, the Knoxville end of Southeastern experienced financial losses, and sold to promotions such as Jim Crockett Promotions and Georgia Championship Wrestling for the next five years. Fuller then made Birmingham his main end of the territory with the Dothan end continuing to flourish, giving early exposure to future stars such as The Fabulous Freebirds, rising stars in the territory along the lines of Austin Idol, and appearances by Ric Flair who would defend the NWA World Heavyweight Title in the area each year.

The Continental years (1985–1989)

Continental Championship Wrestling (1985–1988)
Five years later, Fuller decided that it was time to reach beyond the Southern Alabama/Northern Florida area and re-purchased the Knoxville end of the territory, with this expansion came a name change to Continental Championship Wrestling. After a failed negotiation with CBS, he settled on moving the television show out of the small television studio and into the big arenas where they did house shows in order to give the promotion a national look and feel. While the name Southeastern restricted the promotion to a more regional feel, the name Continental gave fans the impression they toured all over the country, except Alaska and Hawaii.

Continental Wrestling Federation (1988–1989)
In 1988, WCOV-TV owner David Woods bought the controlling interest in the promotion from Ron Fuller, and he renamed it Continental Wrestling Federation in a further attempt to compete with Vince McMahon and appear to resemble a nationwide promotion, even to the point of getting a national TV deal with Financial News Network. Episodes also aired every Monday at 1:30 a.m. ET on the Sunshine Network, a regional sports cable channel that served the Southeastern United States. Their last TV episode aired on November 25, 1989. The promotion closed after their final show on December 6, 1989.

Legacy

Despite many huge angles over the years, this territory often has the status as "the lost promotion". Such obscurity was due to the lack of media coverage during the Gulf Coast and Southeastern years since both Lee Fields and Ron Fuller believed that their promotions should not be covered by wrestling magazines and often did not allow reporters in the locker room to interview the wrestlers. This was to prevent the exposure to kayfabe and preserve the illusion of wrestling as a sport in the area. However, Fuller relented with the changeover to Continental in order to get national exposure for the promotion from the magazines. Such exposure was at an all-time high during the Eddie Gilbert period.

Due to the expensive nature of archiving at television stations before the home video boom of the 1980s, much of the footage from the Gulf Coast era and the Knoxville portion of Southeastern no longer exists, despite a few bits of rare footage turning up here and there. However, almost all of the Dothan portion of Southeastern along with the majority of Continental footage still exists. They are still owned by David Woods and Woods Communications.

Alumni

Johnathan Holliday
The Alaskan Hunters
Andre the Giant
Randy Rose
Pat Rose
Les Thatcher
Lee Fields
Dynamite Dick Dunn
Ronnie Garvin
Dick Slater
Butch Malone
Bob Armstrong
Jos LeDuc
Ron Fuller
Robert Fuller
Whitey Caldwell 
Jerry "Mr. Olympia" Stubbs
Kevin Sullivan 
Paul Orndorff 
Tony Charles
Mongolian Stomper
Ron Miller
Ron Wright
Boris Malenko 
Bob Orton, Jr
Toru Tanaka 
Mr. Fuji
Jim Dalton
Bob Roop 
Brickhouse Brown
Norvell Austin 
Sterling Golden
Tom Prichard
The Bullet
Wildcat Wendell Cooley
Brad Armstrong
Scott Armstrong
Steve Armstrong
Tracy Smothers
Tommy Rich
Johnny Rich
Tim Horner
Larry Hamilton
Bill Kazmaier
Frankie Lancaster
Jimmy Golden
Dutch Mantell
Nature Boy Buddy Landel
Jody "The Flame" Hamilton
Jerry Stubbs
Adrian Street 
The Midnight Rockers (Michaels/Jannetty)
The New Guinea Headhunters
Don Wright
Davey Rich
Miss Brenda Britton
Miss Linda
Dirty White Girl
Moondog Spot
The Storm Trooper
Doug Furnas
Dennis Condrey
Phil Hickerson 
David Schultz 
Austin Idol
"Nightmare" Danny Davis 
Willie B. Hert
Shane Douglas 
Rikki Nelson
Mark Young
Eddie Gilbert
Tony "Dirty White Boy" Anthony
Brian Lee
"Nightmare" Ken Wayne
Lord Humongous
Alan Martin
Moondog Rex
The D.I. (Bob Carter)
The Wild Samoans (Sika & Kokina)
Todd Morton
Downtown Bruno, manager
Paul E. Dangerously, manager
Missy Hyatt, announcer
Ricky Morton
Gordon Solie, announcer
Charlie Platt, announcer
Robert Gibson
Ed Faulk, referee
Rick Gibson
Gorgeous George, Jr.
Sir Dudley Clements
Cowboy Bob Kelly
Ken Lucas
Lester Welch 
Bobby Fields
Buddy Fuller
Herb Welch
Mike Boyette
Billy Spears
Carl Fergie
Cowboy Bob Kelly
Mario Galentto
The Wrestling Pro
Don Fargo
Eduardo Perez
Duke Miller
The Mysterious Medic 
Curtis Smith
"Rotten" Ron Starr
Don Duffy
The Interns (Bill Bowman and Joe Turner)
Ron Carson
Eddie Sullivan and Rip Tyler
The Dirty Daltons
Rick Conners
Maw Bass
Spider Galento
Ken Ramey
Dr. Jerry Graham
Ric Flair
Jerry Lawler
Michael Hayes
Arn Anderson
Superstar Bill Dundee
Roy Lee Welch
Tommy Lane
Mike Davis
Jamie Dundee
Mr. Wrestling II
Nelson Royal
Mr. Knoxville
Hector Guerrero
Rip Rogers
Terrance Garvin
Chris Colt
Shogun Warrior
The Tennessee Stud
Terry Gordy
Jacques Rougeau
Curtis Hughes
Tommy Weathers
Mac Mcurray
Phil Rainey, announcer
Kerry Von Erich
The Great Kabuki
Porkchop Cash
Bill Ash
The Honky Tonk Man
Mike Stallings
Cowboy Ron Bass
Jonathan Boyd
Luke Williams
Stan Lane
The Von Brauners
the Tennessee superstars
Sheik Abdullah
Ray Candy
Masa Saito
The gladiator
Jim Dalton
Mick "Cactus Jack" Foley
The Superstar

Championships

GCCW (1954–1974)
NWA World Heavyweight Championship
NWA World Junior Heavyweight Championship
NWA World Tag Team Championship
NWA United States Tag Team Championship (Gulf Coast version) (1965–1974)
NWA Southeastern Heavyweight Championship
NWA Southern Junior Heavyweight Championship
NWA Southern Tag Team Championship (Gulf Coast Version) (1955–1967)
NWA Gulf Coast Heavyweight Championship
NWA Gulf Coast Tag Team Championship (1967–1977)
NWA Gulf Coast 6-Man Tag Team Championship (1975)
NWA Gulf Coast Brass Knuckles Championship (1971)
NWA Gulf Coast Martial Arts Championship (1975)
NWA Southeast Alabama Heavyweight Championship (1962–1974)
NWA Alabama Tag Team Championship (1970, 1977)
NWA Louisiana Heavyweight Championship (1964–1968)
NWA Mississippi Heavyweight Championship (1958–1976)
NWA Mississippi Tag Team Championship (1968–1973)
NWA Tennessee Tag Team Championship (1967–1977)
NWA City of Dothan Heavyweight Championship (1973–1977)
NWA City of Laurel Tag Team Championship (1969–1971)
NWA City of Mobile Heavyweight Championship (1969–1975)
NWA City of Pensacola Heavyweight Championship (1970–1975)
NWA Panama City Heavyweight Championship (1970–1975)

SECW and CCW (1974–1988)
NWA World Heavyweight Championship (- 1987)
AWA World Heavyweight Championship (1987–1988)
NWA World Junior Heavyweight Championship (- 1987)
NWA Southeastern Heavyweight Championship
NWA Southeastern Heavyweight Championship (Southern Division: 1978–1980)
NWA Continental Heavyweight Championship (1984–1987)
NWA Continental Tag Team Championship (1986–1988)
NWA Southeastern Television Championship
NWA Southeastern Tag Team Championship
NWA Continental Tag Team Championship
NWA Southern Tag Team Championship (Southern Division) (1978–1980)
NWA Southeastern Brass Knuckles Championship (1983)
NWA United States Junior Heavyweight Championship (1976–1989)
NWA Alabama Heavyweight Championship (1974–1988)
NWA Southeastern Tennessee Heavyweight Championship (1987–1988)
NWA Tennessee Tag Team Championship (1967–1977)
NWA Southeastern 6-Man Tag Team Championship

CWF (1988–1989)
AWA World Heavyweight Championship
CWF Heavyweight Championship
CWF Tag Team Championship
United States Junior Heavyweight Championship

See also
List of National Wrestling Alliance territories
List of independent wrestling promotions in the United States

References

External links
GCCWhistory.com
Continental Championship Wrestling at Online World of Wrestling
Kayfabe Memories - Regional territories: GCW
Kayfabe Memories - Regional territories: SECW
Kayfabe Memories - Regional territories: SECW Knoxville
Kayfabe Memories - Regional Territories: CCW/CWF
NWA SECW & CCW Title Histories
CWF Title Histories
The Gulf Coast Years info esp. pertaining to The Gulf Coast Heavyweight Title.
Interview with Cowboy Bob Kelly which provides more info on The Gulf Coast Years
Interview with Nightmare Ken Wayne about The Continental Years

American Wrestling Association
American professional wrestling promotions
National Wrestling Alliance members